Bienvenu Wendla Sawadogo (born 31 December 1995) is a Burkinabé sprinter specialising in the 400 metres. He won a silver medal at the 2017 Jeux de la Francophonie. His personal best of 46.66 is the current national record.

International competitions

Personal bests

Outdoor
200 metres – 21.57 (+0.8 m/s) (Brazzaville 2015) NR
400 metres – 46.66 (Bonneuil-sur-Marne 2019) NR
400 metres hurdles – 	49.25	(Prince Moulay Abdellah, Rabat (MAR)	29 AUG 2019	NR)

References

1995 births
Living people
Burkinabé male sprinters
Athletes (track and field) at the 2015 African Games
Athletes (track and field) at the 2019 African Games
African Games medalists for Burkina Faso
African Games silver medalists for Burkina Faso
African Games medalists in athletics (track and field)
21st-century Burkinabé people